Kalawana is a town in the Ratnapura District of Sabaragamuwa Province in Sri Lanka.

Gem Trade, Tea Plantation and Tourism had been the main source of income for many families in Kalawana for decades.

Kalawana is in the vicinity of the Sinharaja Forest Reserve which is an UNESCO World Heritage site and a biodiversity hotspot in Sri Lanka.

The Kukule Ganga Dam is also located in Kalawana area on the Kukule river.

Climate
Ratnapura - Kalawana belongs to the wet zone of Sri Lanka where ample amount of rain is received throughout the year. The average temperature is 30 degrees Celsius during day time and high humidity is sometimes experienced.

Schools
 Kalawana Central College (National School)
 Gamini Central College
 Rambuka e Village School
 Meepaga Jayanthi Maha Vidyalaya
 Weddagala South Maha Vidyalaya
 Pothupitiya Maha Vidyalaya
 Wewagama Vidyalaya
 Pitigalakanda Vidyalaya
 Nawalakanda Vidyalaya
 Kalawana Primary School
 Wewelkandura Vidyala
 Kalawana Tamil College
 Samanpura Model Primary School	 	
 Pedikanda Vidyalaya
 Royal Primary College
 Kalawana Model Primary School
 Delgoda Vidyalaya
 Wathurawa Janapada Vidyalaya
 Kalawana Gamini Primary School
 Delgoda Janapada Vidyalaya
 Weddagala North Vidyalaya
 Gagalagamuwa Vidyalaya
 Weddagala Kudawa Vidyalaya
 Kudumiriya Vidyalaya
 Panapola Vidyalaya
 Kosgulana Vidyalaya
 Ilumbakanda Vidyalaya
 Ilumbakanada New College
 Kajugaswaththa Vidyalaya
 Kopikella Vidyalaya
 Rambuka New Primary School	 	 
 Thanabela Mahawilahena Vidyalaya
 Dipdeen Tamil School

Hospitals
 Kalawana Base Hospital
 Pothupitiya Divisional Hospital

Police Stations
 Kalawana Police Station
 Pothupitiya Sub Police Station

Banks
 Bank of Ceylon (BOC)
 People's Bank
 National Savings Bank (NSB)
 Regional Development Bank (RDB)
 Co-operative Bank
 Sampath Bank
 Commercial Bank of Ceylon PLC
 DFCC Bank
 Hatton National Bank (HNB)

Populated places in Ratnapura District
Grama Niladhari divisions of Sri Lanka